Edison Ernesto Barrios Castillo (born October 11, 1988, in Villa de Cura, Aragua) is a Venezuelan professional baseball pitcher who is currently a free agent. He previously  played for the Pittsburgh Pirates organization and for the Fukuoka SoftBank Hawks and Yokohama DeNA BayStars of the Nippon Professional Baseball (NPB).

Career

Pittsburgh Pirates
Barrios began his professional career in 2006 with the VSL Pirates of the Pittsburgh Pirates organization. He played for the VCL Pirates in the 2007 and 2008 seasons. He became a free agent following the season.

Fukuoka SoftBank Hawks
Barrios signed with the Fukuoka SoftBank Hawks of Nippon Professional Baseball for the 2011 season. He played for the club in the 2012, 2013, 2014, 2015, and 2016 seasons before becoming a free agent at the end of the 2016 season.

Yokohama DeNA BayStars
After not playing professional baseball in the 2017 season, Barrios signed with the Yokohama DeNA BayStars of Nippon Professional Baseball. He played for the team in the 2018 and 2019 seasons. On October 30, 2019, the BayStars announced that the team will not sign Barrios for the next season. On December 2, 2019, he became a free agent.

Diablos Rojos del Mexico
On April 2, 2020, Barrios signed with the Diablos Rojos del Mexico of the Mexican League. Barrios did not play in a game in 2020 due to the cancellation of the Mexican League season because of the COVID-19 pandemic. On September 7, 2020, Barrios was released.

References

External links
, or Nippon Professional Baseball, or Pelota Binaria (Venezuelan Winter League)

1988 births
Living people
Fukuoka SoftBank Hawks players
Nippon Professional Baseball pitchers
People from Villa de Cura
Tiburones de La Guaira players
Venezuelan expatriate baseball players in Japan
Venezuelan expatriate baseball players in the United States
Venezuelan Summer League Pirates players
Yokohama DeNA BayStars players